There have been a number of 12" guns with 50 caliber length:

 12"/50 caliber Mark 7 gun US Naval gun 1910
 12"/50 caliber Mark 8 gun US Naval gun 1939
 12"/50 (30.5 cm) Bethlehem naval gun US Naval gun 1910, used only in the Argentinian Rivadavia-class battleships
 BL 12 inch Mk XI - XII naval gun British Naval gun
 30.5 cm SK L/50 gun German Naval gun
 Obukhovskii 12"/52 Pattern 1907 gun Russian Naval and Rail gun